A condom is a contraceptive device.

Condom may also refer to:

People
 Jean Condom (born 1960), French international rugby union player
 Jordi Condom (born 1969), Spanish association football coach and former player

Places
 Condom, Gers (AKA Condom-en-Armagnac), a commune in the department of Gers (of which it is a subprefecture) in southwestern France
 Arrondissement of Condom, an arrondissement which contains the commune of Condom
 Bishop of Condom, a bishopric based in Condom 13171801
 Condom Cathedral, a Catholic church, former cathedral, and national monument of France, located in Condom; formerly the seat of the Bishops of Condom
 Condom-d'Aubrac, a commune in the Aveyron department of southern France

Other uses
 "Condom" (song) by Lady Saw, a pro-condom-use song

See also
 
 Kondom (disambiguation)

Surnames of French origin